Charles Ankomah (born 10 April 1996) is a Ghanaian professional footballer who plays as a midfielder for KFC Merelbeke.

References

External links
 

1996 births
Living people
Footballers from Accra
Ghanaian footballers
Association football midfielders
Belgian Pro League players
Challenger Pro League players
Liga II players
Lierse S.K. players
CS Național Sebiș players
Ghanaian expatriate footballers
Ghanaian expatriate sportspeople in Belgium
Expatriate footballers in Belgium
Ghanaian expatriate sportspeople in France
Expatriate footballers in France
Ghanaian expatriate sportspeople in Romania
Expatriate footballers in Romania